Liu Yuzhu (born December 1957) is a Chinese politician and the current director of the National Cultural Heritage Administration.

He was a delegate to the 19th National Congress of the Communist Party of China.

Biography
Liu was born in Huaiyuan County, Anhui, in December 1957. After the Resumption of College Entrance Examination in September 1979, he entered the East China University of Political Science and Law, where he majored in law. After university in 1983, he was assigned to the Ministry of Culture and over a period of 30 years worked his way up to the position of Assistant Minister. In October 2015 he was appointed director of the National Cultural Heritage Administration, replacing Li Xiaojie.

References

1957 births
East China University of Political Science and Law alumni
Living people
People's Republic of China politicians from Anhui
Chinese Communist Party politicians from Anhui
Politicians from Bengbu